"The Day Before the Revolution" is a  science fiction short story by American writer Ursula K. Le Guin, first published in 1974.

It is considered a short story prologue to The Dispossessed and represents an idealized anarchy by following the character of "Odo", the semi-legendary woman who led the revolution that founded the anarchist society in The Dispossessed.

Background and setting 
The Day Before the Revolution takes place in the fictional Hainish universe, created by Le Guin. In the alternative history of this universe, human beings did not evolve on earth, but on Hain. The people of Hain colonized many neighboring planetary systems possibly a million years before the setting of the stories. The Day Before the Revolution is set on the fictional planet of Urras, which possesses a habitable moon, Anarres. It depicts the last day in the life Laia Asieo Odo, a revolutionary figure, shortly before the revolution she helped inspire sweeps through her society. The short story is described as a prologue to The Dispossessed (1974), though it was written after. That novel is set in the same planetary system: the idealized anarchical society depicted in it is based on Odo's teachings. Odo's theory becomes practice after her death and the revolution she inspired, with the colonization of the moon Anarres and the establishment of a society without private property ownership. In The Dispossessed, she is usually referred to as the historical figure "Odo", but in this story, told from her point of view, she is called Laia.

Plot summary
The protagonist Laia is introduced dreaming of her younger self and her lover at a political meeting. Awake, she is shown to be an elderly woman, who has had a major stroke. Her husband is long dead, her days as a political prisoner are in the past and her major anarchist treatises were written many years ago. She lives in the nation of A-Io in an "Odonian House", a building or commune in which her anarchist principles are followed. Odo goes through her daily routine, attempting to dictate letters to her secretary and eat meals she doesn't want. She recognizes that some of the status and honor she is accorded by her fellow anarchists is not in keeping with her principles or theirs. Her routine is interspersed with recollections of her life as a revolutionary, including the death of one of her parents in an insurrection. She discusses with her housemates a revolt in the nation of Thu, and the secession of a province there; they express surprise that a revolution occurred there first. She is visited by a group of foreign students, and feeling trapped by her obligations she decides to go on a walk afterwards. Sneaking out of the house she ventures into the city, but is exhausted before she walks far and is found by a housemate. Back in the house, she is asked to speak the next day at a "general strike", but says she will not be there, and struggles up the stairs toward her room.

Publication and reception 

The story was first published in Galaxy in August 1974, and collected in Le Guin's  short fiction collection The Wind's Twelve Quarters in 1975. It has been anthologized several times, including in Nebula Award Stories 10 (1975), and in the second volume of Pamela Sargent's Women of Wonder series, More Women of Wonder (1975).

"The Day Before the Revolution" won the Nebula Award for short story in 1974, the Locus Award for short story in 1975, and was nominated for the short story Hugo Award in 1975. It is described as one of Le Guin's most analyzed short stories. The Dispossessed won the Hugo and Nebula awards for best novel in the same year.

Themes 
The experience of aging, death, grief and sexuality in older age are themes explored in the short story that were largely absent from The Dispossessed, which has a younger protagonist. 
Her waking periods are interspersed with recollections of her past. Odo's character is defined by "dynamic ambivalence" as she struggles between contradictory impulses, according to scholar Charlotte Spivack. Though she was the progenitor of the revolutionary theories her housemates now follow, she has feelings of ambivalence towards them, asking "Why the hell [do I] have to be a good Odonian?" She derives satisfaction from "being a monument" to her movement, but also resents it. All her life she has been the center of a political movement, and now she worries she has become peripheral; at the same time, she's is reluctant to participate in the activities she is responsible for. Her role in the period of time described in the title exemplifies the "tension of opposites" within her. Odo has worked for societal change her entire life, including writing books and spending time in prison; she is the "guiding spirit of the revolution". However, when she's asked to speak the next day by her housemates, she replies that she "won't be here tomorrow". Her reply refers to her physical condition, but has a deeper meaning, as she dies after climbing the stairs to her room, and so does not witness the revolution she was responsible for. 

Le Guin uses vivid imagery to convey the experience of being elderly; on waking, "looks down at her feet with loathing", and struggles with her the deterioration her body has experienced as the result of a stroke.

The character Odo is described by Le Guin in her introduction to the story as "one of the ones who walked away from Omelas", a reference to her short story The Ones Who Walk Away from Omelas. Spivack writes that she exemplifies the titular individual of the short story, who "cannot enjoy a prosperity dependent on the suffering of others". Literary scholar Donna White writes that Odo was Le Guin's most successful female protagonist until the publication of The Eye of the Heron in 1978. Spivack analyzes Odo as an example of a dynamic elderly figure in Le Guin's writing, who shares similarities with Wold in Planet of Exile and the middle-aged Ged in The Farthest Shore. While all the characters have aged, they are not stereotypes; limited by their physical bodies, they retain the ability to affect their worlds.

The Day Before the Revolution is described as a character study that happens to use a science fiction setting. Science fiction critic George Slusser writes that it is "harshly realistic" in its focus on death and old age. White notes that the story resembles contemporary realistic fiction more than science fiction, arguing that it represents, along with The Dispossessed, part of a tonal shift in Le Guin's writing away from "romantic quests". Focusing on Odo's old age, rather than her period as an active revolutionary, Le Guin examines a person's essential motivations besides idealism. Odo acknowledges to herself sex and vanity, and also mulls over the happiness she had and then lost. Darren Harris-Fain called it a "moving depiction" of Odo, and stated that The Day Before the Revolution was among stories with thorough character development that demonstrated the literary worth of science fiction.

References

Sources

Further reading

External links 
 
 the story at Library of America

1974 short stories
Anarchist fiction
Science fiction short stories
Works originally published in Galaxy Science Fiction
Short stories by Ursula K. Le Guin
Nebula Award for Best Short Story-winning works
Fiction set around Tau Ceti